Wu Yake (Chinese: 吴亚轲; born 3 February 1991 in Wuhan) is a Chinese footballer who currently plays as a goalkeeper for Chinese Super League side Changchun Yatai.

Club career
In 2011, Wu Yake started his professional footballer career with Changchun Yatai in the Chinese Super League.  In March 2012, Wu was loaned to China League Two side Guizhou Zhicheng until 31 December 2012. On 15 July 2015, Wu made his debut for Changchun in the 2015 Chinese Super League against Liaoning Whowin.

Career statistics 

Statistics accurate as of match played 31 December 2020.

Honours

Club
Changchun Yatai
 China League One: 2020
Guizhou Hengfeng
China League Two: 2012

References

External links
 

1991 births
Living people
Chinese footballers
Footballers from Wuhan
Changchun Yatai F.C. players
Guizhou F.C. players
Chinese Super League players
China League One players
China League Two players
Association football goalkeepers
21st-century Chinese people